Sexual Assault was a Canadian punk band from St. Catharines, Ontario.

History

Controversy 
The band was developing notoriety due to a campaign, led by the Niagara Sexual Assault Center, and Feminine Action Collective trying to get the band to change its name. Opposing groups say the band is violating human rights and turning Sexual Assault into a casual issue. The band denies such claims, saying that their name and music are open to interpretation.

See also
List of bands from Canada

References

Canadian hardcore punk groups
Musical groups established in 2008
Musical groups from St. Catharines
2008 establishments in Ontario